Bowater is an English surname. Notable people with the surname include:

Frank Bowater (1866–1947), English politician
George Bowater (1911–1966), English footballer
Vansittart Bowater (1862–1938), English politician
William Vansittart Bowater (1838–1907), British businessman

English-language surnames